Songshan or Song Shan, "pine mountain," (both variably written in Chinese as  or ) may refer to any of the following places:

Districts
Mount Song, or Song Shan, one of the Five Sacred Mountains of Taoism, on the south bank of the Yellow River in Henan
Songshan National Nature Reserve, a nature reserve in Yanqing District, a suburban district in Beijing
Songshan, a mountainous area in western Yunnan where the Battle of Mount Song was fought in 1944 between Chinese Nationalist and retreating Japanese forces over control of the Burma Road
Songshan District, Chifeng, Inner Mongolia
Songshan District, Taipei
Songshan Cultural and Creative Park, a park in Taipei
Taipei Songshan Airport
Songshan Line of the Taipei Metro
Songshan Station

Subdistricts
Songshan Road Subdistrict, Zhengzhou, in Erqi District, Zhengzhou, Henan

Towns
Songshan, Fujian, in Luoyuan County
Songshan, Guizhou, in Ziyun Miao and Buyei Autonomous County
Songshan, Gansu, in Bairi (Tianzhu) Tibetan Autonomous County
Songshan, Guangxi, in Rong County
Songshan, Liaoning, in Taihe District, Jinzhou
Songshan, Jilin, in Panshi

Persons
 Hu Songshan, a Chinese muslim activist

Groups
 Henan Songshan Longmen F.C., a football club

See also
 Zhongshan (disambiguation)
 松山 (disambiguation)